Vera Complojer (1896–1969) was an Austrian stage and film actress.

Selected filmography
 Maria Ilona (1939)
 Her First Experience (1939)
 Detours to Happiness (1939)
 Wunschkonzert (1940)
 The Sinful Village (1940)
 Left of the Isar, Right of the Spree (1940)
 Melody of a Great City (1943)
 Wild Bird (1943)
 The White Adventure (1952)
 The Poacher of the Silver Wood (1957)
 Salzburg Stories (1957)
 The Spessart Inn (1958)
 Sebastian Kneipp (1958)
 I Must Go to the City (1962)
 The Merry Wives of Tyrol (1964)
 Der Weibsteufel (1966)
 The Murderer with the Silk Scarf (1966)

References

Bibliography 
 Giesen, Rolf.  Nazi Propaganda Films: A History and Filmography. McFarland, 2003.

External links 
 

1896 births
1968 deaths
Actors from Klagenfurt
Austrian film actresses
Austrian stage actresses